Dark Magic (1939) is a short comedy film produced by Robert Benchley for Metro-Goldwyn-Mayer. Benchley appears as Joe Doakes, who goes to a magic shop to see a magician perform magic tricks. Sharp-eyed viewers will recognize "Mr. Calypso", the magic demonstrator, as none other than sleight-of-hand master John Scarne.

See also
List of Robert Benchley collections and film appearances

References
 Nathaniel Benchley, Robert Benchley, a biography.  (New York City, McGraw-Hill, 1955)

External links
 

Metro-Goldwyn-Mayer short films
1939 films
1939 short films
American comedy short films
American black-and-white films
1939 comedy films
1930s American films